Richland Township is a township in Jasper County, Iowa, USA.

History
Richland Township was established in 1860.

References

Townships in Jasper County, Iowa
Townships in Iowa
1860 establishments in Iowa